Yastrebna is a village in northeastern Bulgaria, part of the Sitovo Municipality, Silistra Province. The village has a population of 11 people. There is a stone-pit near the village.

The current mayor is Edjevit Shaban.

Villages in Silistra Province